Eriogonum hoffmannii is a species of wild buckwheat known by the common name Hoffmann's buckwheat. It is endemic to Inyo County, California, where it is found only in the mountains around Death Valley; most of the known populations of the plant are located in Death Valley National Park. The plant grows in the desert scrub on the slopes of the Panamint, Black, and Funeral Mountains.

Description
This buckwheat is an annual herb growing up to a meter in height with a slender flowering stem. The round woolly leaves are located about the base of the stem. The inflorescence is a series of branches lined with smaller branches bearing many small clusters of tiny white, pink, or reddish flowers.

There are two varieties of this species. The more common, var. robustius, takes an erect form up to a meter tall, while var. hoffmannii is a shorter, spreading plant.

References

External links
Jepson Manual Treatment
Photo gallery

hoffmannii
Endemic flora of California
Flora of the California desert regions
Death Valley National Park
Natural history of Inyo County, California
Natural history of the Mojave Desert
Panamint Range
Flora without expected TNC conservation status